Dariya Nikitichna Dobroczajeva (Ukrainian: Дарія Микитівна Доброчаєва; March 30, 1916, Khyshnyky, now Khmelnytskyi Raion, Khmelnytskyi Oblast, Ukraine – December 1, 1995, Kyiv, Ukraine) was a Ukrainian botanist and university teacher.

Biography
Dobroczajeva was the head of the Botanical Museum of the Botanical Institute of the National Academy of Sciences of Ukraine. She brought back numerous herbarium materials from expeditions in Ukraine and private trips to various countries, donating more than 30,000 herbarium sheets to the Institute of Botany. For a long time, she headed the herbarium exchange fund, significantly expanded her connections to botanical institutions in many countries of Europe, Asia and America, and intensified her work to replenish the world flora collection. Her area of specialty was Spermatophyte.

In 1969, Dobroczajeva was a recipient of the State Prize of the Ukrainian SSR for Science and Technology. In 1982, she received the Honored Worker in Science and Technology of the Ukrainian SSR. The standard author abbreviation Dobrocz. is used to identify that person as the author when citing a botanical name.

Plants described 

 Centaurea alutacea Dobrocz. 1949
 Centaurea czerkessica Dobrocz. and Kotov, 1962
 Centaurea nigriceps Dobrocz. 1946
 Centaurea pseudomaculosa Dobrocz. 1949
 Centaurea pseudocoriacea Dobrocz. 1949
 Centaurea ternopoliensis Dobrocz. 1949
 Anthemis subtinctoria Dobrocz. 1961
 Anthemis parviceps Dobrocz. and Fed. ex Klokov, 1974
 Anthemis zephyrovii Dobrocz. 1961
 Echium popovii Dobrocz. 1977
 Myosotis popovii Dobrocz. 1957
 Onosma guberlinensis Dobrocz. and Vinogr. 1966
 Onosma macrochaetum Klokov and Dobrocz. 1957
 Onosma volgense Dobrocz. 1977
 Symphytum popovii Dobrocz. 1968
 Spiraea litwinowii Dobrocz. 1954
 Trapa danubialis Dobrocz. 1955
 Trapa flerovii Dobrocz. 1955
 Trapa macrorhiza Dobrocz. 1955
 Helianthemum creticola Klokov and Dobrocz. 1974
 Helianthemum cretophilum Klokov and Dobrocz. 1974

Selected works

Books
 Dariya N. Dobrochaeva, I.U.D. Kleopov. 1990. Analiz Flory Shirokolistvennykh Lesov Evropeiskoi Chasti SSSR. 350 pp. ISBN 5-12-000800-3
 Dariya N. Dobrochaeva, G.P. Mokritskii. 1991. Vladimir Ippolitovich Lipskii. 214 pp. ISBN 5-12-001749-5

Articles
 Zaverukha BV, Ilyinskaya AP, Shevera MV Daryna Mykytivna Dobrochaeva (to the 75th anniversary of her birth), Ukrainian Botanical Journal, 1991, vol. 48, no. 2, pp. 109–110. (in Ukrainian)
 "Wreath of remembrance on the fresh grave of Professor Darina Mykytivna Dobrochaeva", Ukrainian Botanical Journal, 1996. - vol. 53, no. 1–2, pp. 154–61. (in Ukrainian)
 AP Ilyinskaya, VV Protopopova, MV Shever. "The man who did good" (to the 95th anniversary of the birth of Professor Darina Mykytivna Dobrochaeva). Ukrainian Botanical Journal, 2011, vol. 68, no. 3, pp. 475–477. ISSN 0372-4123 (in Ukrainian)
 Ilyinskaya AP, Shevera MV Daryna Mykytivna Dobrochaeva (1916-1995). - K.-Kremenchuk: PP Shcherbatykh, 2006. p. 40. (in Ukrainian)
 Protopopova V., Shevera M. Researcher of flora Professor Daryna Mykytivna Dobrochaeva "Woman in science and education: past, present, future". Mat-li 2 Int. scientific-practical conf. (Kyiv, 2002). - K., 2002,  pp. 322–324 (in Ukrainian)
 Shevera MV Dobrochaeva DM, Encyclopedia of modern Ukraine. vol. 8. Dl-Dya. Kyiv: Institute of Encyclopedic Research of the National Academy of Sciences of Ukraine, 2008, p. 128. (in Ukrainian)
 KM Sitnik. "Outstanding women scientists of the Institute of Botany". MG Kholodny National Academy of Sciences of Ukraine, Ukrainian Botanical Journal, 2011, vol. 68, no. 2. ISSN 0372-4123 (in Ukrainian)

Awards and honours

 1969: State Prize of the Ukrainian SSR for Science and Technology
 1982: Honored Worker in Science and Technology of the Ukrainian SSR
 The Dobrochaeva Botanical Museum is named after her and is one of the five exhibitions of the National Museum of Science and Natural History of the National Academy of Sciences of Ukraine, housed in the National Museum of Natural History.

References

External links 
 Biography in Encyclopedia of Modern Ukraine (in Ukrainian)

1916 births
1995 deaths
Ukrainian botanists
Members of the National Academy of Sciences of Ukraine
People from Khmelnytskyi Oblast
20th-century Ukrainian women scientists
Ukrainian women biologists
Women botanists
20th-century botanists